Camden College was an independent, Congregational Union of Australia, day and boarding school for boys from 1864 until 1877 and theological college for the training of Christian ministers from 1864 until 1974.

History
Thomas Holt and the Congregational Church founded a boys school and theological college at Camden, the former home of Robert Bourne, on 12 July 1864. Camden College, as the institution became known, was just north of the present Camden Street on the border of Newtown and Enmore in New South Wales.

Samuel Chambers Kent, the Congregational minister in Newtown from 1861, became the founding warden and resident chaplain of Camden College from 1864 to 1872. Kent's portrait hangs in the library of the Uniting Theological College in Parramatta.

Camden College and its garden were subdivided in 1877 and the college moved to Glebe. The college buildings, including Camden, were demolished in 1888.

In 1974 prior to the formation of the Uniting Church in Australia from the Congregational Union, the Methodist Church and the Presbyterian Church, Camden College merged with Leigh College and St Andrew's Theological Hall to form the United Theological College, a part of the theology school at Charles Sturt University.

Notable alumni
 Arthur Aspinall
 Alexander Petrie Campbell 
 Joseph Cullen
 Hubert Cunliffe-Jones
 Harry Kent
 Kenneth Mackay
 Frederick Pratt

See also 

 List of non-government schools in New South Wales
 List of boarding schools

References

Defunct schools in New South Wales
Defunct universities and colleges in Australia
Educational institutions established in 1864
Former boarding schools in New South Wales
Defunct boys' schools in Australia
1864 establishments in Australia
1974 disestablishments
Educational institutions disestablished in 1974